"Love, Needing" is a song recorded by Japanese singer songwriter Mai Kuraki, taken from her fifth studio album Fuse of Love. It was released on January 26, 2005, by Giza Studio. The song was written by Aika Ohno, Hiroshi Asai and Kuraki herself, who also produced the single.

Track listing

Charts

External links
Mai Kuraki Official Website

Mai Kuraki songs
2005 singles
Songs written by Aika Ohno
Songs written by Mai Kuraki
2005 songs
Giza Studio singles